East Park may refer to:

Places in the UK
East Park, Kingston upon Hull, East Riding of Yorkshire, England
East Park, Wolverhampton, a park in Wolverhampton, West Midlands, England
East Park (ward), an electoral ward of the Wolverhampton City Council, England
East Park, County Antrim, a townland in County Antrim, Northern Ireland
East Park, a former football ground in Paisley, Scotland, home of Abercorn F.C. 1877–1879

Places in the U.S.
East Park (Mason City, Iowa), a recreational park listed on the National Register of Historic Places
East Park Township, Minnesota, in Marshall County
East Park (Greenville, South Carolina), a neighborhood

See also
East Park Historic District (disambiguation)